Reign of the Zodiac is a comic-book series created in 2003 by Keith Giffen (writer), Colleen Doran (penciller) and Bob Wiacek (inker), and published by DC Comics.

References
Beau Yarbrough. Star Power: Giffen And Doran Preview 'Reign Of The Zodiac. Comic Book Resources. July 11, 2003

2003 comics debuts
DC Comics titles